To compromise is to make a deal between different parties where each party gives up part of their demand.

Compromise, compromised, or compromising may also refer to:

Arts, media, and entertainment
 Compromise (film), a 1925 American silent drama film
 Compromised (book), a 2020 American non-fiction book
 Compromised (film), a 1931 American drama film
 "Compromised" (Legends of Tomorrow), the fifth episode of the second season of Legends of Tomorrow

Computing
 Compromising, in hacking computers or networks; see computer security
 Business email compromise, a cyber crime that uses email fraud to attack businesses and organizations

Other uses
 Compromise agreement, a specific type of contract regulated by statute in the United Kingdom
 Compromise Township, Champaign County, Illinois, United States, a township

See also
 No Compromise (disambiguation)
 Southern Compromise (disambiguation)
 The Great Compromise (disambiguation)